The 1978 National Soccer League season was the fifty-fifth season under the National Soccer League (NSL) name. The season began in May 1978 and concluded in late September 1978 with the Toronto Falcons defeating Hamilton Italo-Canadians for the NSL Cup. The regular-season title and NSL Championship were successfully defended by the Montreal Castors by finishing first in the First Division. The Second Division title was won by St. Catharines Roma by finishing first in the standings. 

The NSL was operative in Northern Ontario, Quebec, and had a franchise in the United States in Upstate New York. The season also marked the final time the league employed the promotion and relegation system as the Second Division was dissolved the following year.

Overview 
The membership in the First Division increased to 11 teams with Buffalo Blazers, Ottawa Tigers, and Toronto Falcons receiving promotions. Ottawa was defeated in the previous season's promotion and relegation match series by Toronto Croatia but still was granted promotion to the First Division. The departing clubs were Toronto Macedonia, and the Serbian White Eagles were inactive for the season. Toronto Macedonia attempted to sell their franchise rights to Montreal Stars, but the move was declined by the league ownership. 

A league meeting occurred in early September where the league ownership decided to eliminate the playoff format and conclude the season early after the completion of the NSL Cup tournament. The league champions Montreal Castors decided to withdraw from the competition, while the Windsor Stars forfeited after protesting the league's decision to change their opponent. The Second Division consisted of 7 teams with the Toronto Ukrainians returning to the NSL after a two-year absence. The Montreal Stars were absent for the season but returned for the 1979 season. Further changes occurred at the administrative level with John Fischer succeeding Joe Piccininni as the league's president.

Teams

Coaching changes

Standings

First Division

Second Division

References

External links
RSSSF CNSL page
thecnsl.com - 1978 season

1978–79 domestic association football leagues
National Soccer League
1978